Anton Ivanescu is a Romanian sprint canoeist who competed in the mid-1960s. He won a gold medal in the K-1 4 x 500 m event at the 1963 ICF Canoe Sprint World Championships in Jajce.

References

Living people
Romanian male canoeists
Year of birth missing (living people)
ICF Canoe Sprint World Championships medalists in kayak